The key political players in Himachal Pradesh state in north-west India are the Indian National Congress and Bharatiya Janata Party.

The politics of Himachal Pradesh are more associated with the regional divides of the state.

Based on electoral divide, the state can be divided as - Upper Himanchal consisting the districts of Shimla, Sirmaur and parts of Mandi, Kullu, Lahaul and Spiti, Solan, Kinnaur and Chamba; and Lower Himachal consisting the districts of Kangra, Hamirpur, Bilaspur, Una and the lower region of Mandi district.The State was reorganised on 1966 through the Punjab Reorganisation Act by adding some parts of Punjab to the state of Himanchal Pradesh; and the parts of old Himachal and the newly merged areas too differ in their voting pattern.

National politics
There are four Lok Sabha (lower house of the Indian Parliament) constituencies in Himachal Pradesh.

State politics
The Himachal Pradesh's Legislative Assembly has 68 seats who are directly elected from single-seat constituencies.

1952 Legislative Assembly election

1967 Legislative Assembly election

1972 Legislative Assembly election

1977 Legislative Assembly election

1982 Legislative Assembly election

1985 Legislative Assembly election

1990 Legislative Assembly election

1993 Legislative Assembly election

1998 Legislative Assembly election

Keys:

2003 Legislative Assembly election

Keys:

2007 Legislative Assembly election

The 2007 Himachal Pradesh legislative assembly election were held in Himachal Pradesh in 2007.

Keys:

2012 Legislative Assembly election

Keys:

2017 Legislative Assembly election

BJP won 44 out of 68 seats to form the government, ousting Congress party from power. Indian National Congress won 21 seats. Jai Ram Thakur was appointed as Chief Minister after the elections.

Keys:

2022 Legislative Assembly election 

Keys:

See also
 Himachal Pradesh Legislative Assembly

References